Nazli Sabri (25 June 1894 – 29 May 1978) was the first queen consort in the Kingdom of Egypt from 1919 to 1936. She was the second wife of Fuad I, King of Egypt.

Early life
Nazli was born on 25 June 1894 into a family of Egyptian, Turkish, Greek, and French origin. Her father was Abdur Rahim Sabri Pasha, minister of agriculture and governor of Cairo, and her mother was Tawfika Khanum Sharif. Nazli had a brother, Sherif Sabri Pasha, and a sister, Amina Sabri.

She was the maternal granddaughter of Major General Mohamed Sherif Pasha, prime minister and minister of foreign affairs, who was of Turkish origin. She was also a great-granddaughter of the French-born officer Suleiman Pasha.

Nazli first went to the Lycée de la Esclave-de-Dieu in Cairo, and later to the Collège Notre-Dame de Sion in Alexandria. Following the death of her mother, she and her sister were sent to a boarding school in Paris for two years. After returning, Nazli was forced to marry her cousin, Khalil Sabri. However, the marriage ended in divorce after eleven months. After the separation, she stayed at the house of Safiya Zaghloul, where she met Zaghloul's nephew Saeed Zaghloul; the two were engaged until Saeed broke up with her during his exile with his uncle Saad Zaghloul following the 1919 revolution.

Queen

The Sultan of Egypt, Fuad I first saw Nazli at an opera performance. On 12 May 1919, Fuad proposed to her, although he was 26 years her senior. On 24 May 1919 Nazli married Sultan Fuad I at Bustan Palace, Cairo. It was the second marriage for both Nazli and Fuad. She later moved to the haramlek in the Abbasiya Palace. She was under pressure from her husband to produce a son, and was warned that she would be confined to the haremlek if she did not do so.

After the birth of their only son, Farouk, she was allowed to move into Koubbeh Palace, the official royal residence, with her husband. When Fuad's title was altered to King, she was given the title of Queen. She then had four daughters: Fawzia, Faiza, Faika, and Fathia.

Restricted to the palace throughout most of Fuad's reign, she was permitted to attend opera performances, flower shows, and other ladies-only cultural events. As her upbringing had left her remarkably educated, cultured and emancipated for an Egyptian woman of the time, she found this prescribed existence backward and stifling. It was said that whenever the royal couple fought, she was slapped by the king and confined to her suite for weeks. It was also alleged that she tried to commit suicide by overdosing on aspirin.

Nazli accompanied the king during part of his four-month tour of Europe in 1927, and was much fêted in France because of her French ancestry. With the inauguration of Parliament in 1924, she was among the royal attendees at the opening ceremony, seated in a special section of the guest gallery.

Later years
Following the death of King Fuad in 1936, her son Farouk became the new King of Egypt, and she became the queen mother. Her brother Sherif Sabri Pasha served on the three-member Regency Council that was formed during Farouk's minority. In 1946, Nazli left Egypt and went to the United States for treatment for a kidney ailment.

On 13 September 1950 King Farouk deprived the Queen Mother, and her daughter Princess Fathia of their rights and titles. This was due to latter's marriage, which Nazli supported, but was against Farouk's wishes, to Riyad Ghali Effendi, a Coptic Christian. Nazli later converted to Christianity, changing her name to Mary-Elizabeth.

In 1955 Nazli purchased, for $63,000, a 28-room mansion in Beverley Hills, where she lived with Fathia, her son-in-law, and their two children, and led an active social life.

In 1965, Nazli attended the funeral of Farouk, in Rome.

Following Fathia's divorce, Nazli moved to a small apartment in Westwood, Los Angeles, where Fathia eventually joined her after temporarily moving to Hawaii.

To meet debt demands, in 1975 Nazli sent her principal jewellery to auction at Sothebys, including a magnificent art deco tiara (720 diamonds weighing 274 carats) and matching necklace commissioned in 1938 from Van Cleef & Arpels. They sold for $127,500 and $140,000 respectively. However, Nazli and Fathia still ended up in bankruptcy court. In 1978, Fathia's jewellery was also sold to meet debts.

In 1976, President of Egypt, Anwar Sadat, sent a proposal to Queen Nazli and Princess Fathia that passports would be provided to Queen Nazli and Princess Fathia to give them right of return to Egypt. Eventually she settled in the US, due to her painful illness. She died on 29 May 1978 at the age of 83 in Los Angeles, California.

Legacy
Queen Nazli's art deco necklace reappeared at a Sotheby's sale in December 2015. The Queen ordered the Van Cleef & Arpels necklace along with a matching tiara for her daughter's (Fawzia) wedding. The necklace is formed by 600 round and baguette diamonds arranged in a sunburst motif.

Titles and styles

26 May 1919 – 15 March 1922: Her Gloriness The Sultana
15 March 1922 – 18 January 1938: Her Majesty The Queen
18 January 1938 – 8 August 1950: Her Majesty Queen Nazli

In popular culture 
In 2007, Queen Nazli was played by Egyptian actress Wafaa Amer in the Drama "El-malek Farouk".

In 2008, Rawia Rashed published a book about Queen Nazli, titled Nazli, Malika Fi El Manfa (Nazli, A Queen in Exile). Based on this book, an Egyptian TV series provided an account for the life of Queen Nazli, Queen in Exile, starring Egyptian actress Nadia Al Jundi in 2010.

See also
 List of consorts of the Muhammad Ali Dynasty
 History of Egypt under the Muhammad Ali dynasty

References

Bibliography

External links
 Egyptian Royalty by Ahmed S. Kamel, Hassan Kamel Kelisli-Morali, Georges Soliman and Magda Malek.
 L'Egypte D'Antan... Egypt in Bygone Days by Max Karkegi.

|-

19th-century Egyptian women
20th-century Egyptian women
1894 births
1978 deaths
Burials at Holy Cross Cemetery, Culver City
Converts to Roman Catholicism from Islam
Egyptian emigrants to the United States
Egyptian former Muslims
Egyptian people of French descent
Egyptian people of Turkish descent
Egyptian people of Greek descent
Egyptian queens consort
Egyptian Roman Catholics
Muhammad Ali dynasty
People from Alexandria
Queen mothers